is a Japanese footballer currently playing as a winger for Renofa Yamaguchi. He is the son of the former Japanese international defender, Hayuma Tanaka and fashion model, Malia.

Career statistics

Club
.

Notes

References

External links

2002 births
Living people
Japanese footballers
Association football defenders
J3 League players
J2 League players
Kashiwa Reysol players
Cerezo Osaka players
Cerezo Osaka U-23 players
Renofa Yamaguchi FC players